Mister Global 2022 was the 8th edition of Mister Global pageant, held in Chiang Mai, Thailand on February 11, 2023. Danh Chiếu Linh of Vietnam crowned Juan Carlos Ariosa of Cuba as his successor at the end of the event.

Background
A record number of 39 representatives competed for the title. The 8th Mister Global Preliminary Competition was broadcast live via Mister Global Youtube Channel at 18.00 PM Thailand Time.

On 11 February 2023, the final ceremony of the 8th Mister Global Competition was streamed live via Mister Global Youtube Channel at 18.00 PM Thailand Time from Chiang Mai, which hosted the competition for the third time and the 2023 location was announced during The 8th Mister Global Final Competition live telecast and the 9th edition will return to Maha Sarakham, Thailand on November 26, 2023.

Results

Special awards

Contestants
39 contestants competed for the title:

References

External links
Official Website
Official Instagram 
Official Facebook
Official Youtube

Global
2023 in Thailand